is a passenger railway station located in Naka-ku, in the city of Okayama, Okayama Prefecture, Japan. It is operated by West Japan Railway Company (JR West).

Lines
Takashima Station is served by the San'yō Main Line an is 138.9 km from the starting of the Sanyo Main Line at Kōbe Station.

Layout
The station has two ground level opposed side platforms, connected by a footbridge, located next to the elevated Sanyo Shinkansen tracks. The station has a Midori no Madoguchi staffed ticket office.

Platforms

History
Takashima Station opened on 14 March 1985. With the privatization of Japanese National Railways (JNR) on 1 April 1987, the station came under the control of JR West.

Passenger statistics
In fiscal 2019, the station was used by an average of 3551 passengers daily

Surrounding area
The surrounding area is a residential area. There is a municipal housing complex on the north side of the station, and in this housing complex there is a police office, a certified children's center, and the Okayama Takashima housing complex post office.

Okayama Municipal Takashima Elementary School
Okayama Municipal Asahiryu Elementary School
Okayama Municipal Takashima Junior High School

See also
 List of railway stations in Japan

References

External links

  

Stations of West Japan Railway Company
Railway stations in Okayama
Sanyō Main Line
Railway stations in Japan opened in 1985